was a city located in Yamaguchi Prefecture, Japan. The city was founded on November 3, 1940.

As of 2003, the city had an estimated population of 44,953 and the density of 1,044.20 persons per km2. The total area was 43.05 km2.

On March 22, 2005, Onoda, along with the town of San'yō (from Asa District), was merged to create the city of San'yō-Onoda.

Dissolved municipalities of Yamaguchi Prefecture